The individual eventing in equestrian at the 1932 Summer Olympics in Los Angeles was held at the Riviera Country Club (dressage), a specially built course in Westchester (cross-country), and the Olympic Stadium (jumping) from 10 to 13 August. NOCs were limited to three horse and rider pairs.

Charles Pahud de Mortanges and Marcroix, the defending gold medalists, became the first equestrian pair to repeat as champions. They did so despite not winning any of the three stages.

Competition format

The team and individual eventing competitions used the same scores. Eventing consisted of a dressage test, a cross-country test, and a jumping test. The total maximum score was 2000 points, with 400 available in dressage, 1300 in cross-country, and 300 in jumping. In the dressage portion, three juries gave scores out of 400; the average of the three was the score for the segment. In the cross-country section, penalties were issued for faults and for going over the time limit (with small bonuses available for finishing early); the total penalties minus bonuses were subtracted from 1300 to give the score for the round. Penalties were also given for faults and slow performances in jumping, with the total penalties subtracted from 300 for that round. The three segment scores were summed to give a final score.

Schedule

Results

Standings after dressage

Chamberlin won the first portion of the eventing competition, taking a lead slightly over 7 points against his countryman Argo.

Standings after cross country

With 1300 points available, the cross country competition was by far the largest contributor to the eventing scores. The dressage leaders did not fare well in the cross country portion, with Chamberlin finishing fifth in the segment with 192.5 penalties and Argo finishing eighth with 392.5 penalties. Thomson, sixth after dressage, vaulted to the lead with a nearly clean round--incurring 35 time penalties in the open country but earning 6 bonus time points in the steeplechase. De Mortanges and von Rosen, second and third in the round with 58.0 and 58.5 penalties, moved into second and third place overall. The gap between von Rosen and Chamberlin--now in fourth place--was over 100 points, a very difficult distance to close with only the jumping portion remaining; barring disaster for one of the three, the medalists had largely been decided at this point and were competing with each other for final placement. Barriguete did not start the cross country portion; four others did not finish it.

Final results after jumping

Argo had a clean round, with no faults and only 0.75 time penalties, to make up significant ground on the field; nobody else had fewer than 40 penalties in the round. However, the three leaders after the cross country segment did well enough to each medal. Thomson, who had the lead, fared worst, incurring 60 penalties. This allowed de Mortanges, with only 40 penalties in the round, to overtake him and successfully repeat the Olympic championship. Von Rosen, with 40 jumping penalties as well, would also have passed Thomson if not for von Rosen's 2.75 time penalties--just enough to keep the Swede in the third position and give the American the silver medal.

References

Individual eventing